Myntha Elisabeth of Cleves was  Duchess of Bavaria-Ingolstadt from 1401 to 1413. She was the daughter of the Duke of Cleves - Adolf III of the Marck and Margaret of Jülich. She married Reginald of Falkenburg in 1393, who died in 1396. In 1401, she started a new marriage with the Duke of Bavaria but had no children.

References

See also
Duchy of Bavaria
Kleve
Duchy of Cleves

People from the Duchy of Cleves
1378 births
1424 deaths
House of La Marck
14th-century German nobility
14th-century German women
15th-century German nobility
15th-century German women